Sushila Ganesh Mavalankar (4 August 1904 – 11 December 1995) was an Indian freedom fighter. She was elected to the 1st Lok Sabha unopposed from Ahmedabad in 1956.

Early life
Daughter to Ramakrishna Gopinath Gurjar Date, Sushila was born on 4 August 1904 in the Bombay State and did her schooling to the under- metric level.

Career
Mavalankar took active part in the Indian Independence movement and on the call of Mahatma Gandhi participated in the Quit India Movement in 1942, which led to her imprisonment by the British authorities. She attended the coronation of Queen Elizabeth II held in June 1953.

The death of Ganesh Mavalankar in February 1956 prompted a bye-election for the Ahmedabad seat. The INC fielded Sushila Mavalankar (his wife) and she was elected unopposed to the 1st Lok Sabha. Her term finished the following year. She also served as the president of Bhagini Samaj and was a member of numerous social organisations.

Personal life
Sushila married Ganesh Vasudev Mavalankar in March 1921, with whom she had four sons. Ganesh Mavalankar became of the first speaker of the Lok Sabha. She died in Ahmedabad on 11 December 1995. Their son Purushottam Mavalankar was also a parliamentarian.

References

1904 births
1995 deaths
India MPs 1952–1957
Women members of the Lok Sabha
Lok Sabha members from Maharashtra
Prisoners and detainees of British India
Marathi people
Politicians from Ahmedabad
20th-century Indian women
20th-century Indian people